This is a list of MRT and LRT lines in Singapore, with details on costs, construction timelines and route length.

MRT and LRT lines

References

Mass Rapid Transit (Singapore) lines
Underground rapid transit in Singapore
Singapore transport-related lists